Rayleigh scattering, named after the 19th-century British physicist Lord Rayleigh (John William Strutt), is the predominantly elastic scattering of light or other electromagnetic radiation by particles much smaller than the wavelength of the radiation. For light frequencies well below the resonance frequency of the scattering particle (normal dispersion regime), the amount of scattering is inversely proportional to the fourth power of the wavelength.

Rayleigh scattering results from the electric polarizability of the particles. The oscillating electric field of a light wave acts on the charges within a particle, causing them to move at the same frequency. The particle, therefore, becomes a small radiating dipole whose radiation we see as scattered light. The particles may be individual atoms or molecules; it can occur when light travels through transparent solids and liquids, but is most prominently seen in gases.

Rayleigh scattering of sunlight in Earth's atmosphere causes diffuse sky radiation, which is the reason for the blue color of the daytime and twilight sky, as well as the yellowish to reddish hue of the low Sun. Sunlight is also subject to Raman scattering, which changes the rotational state of the molecules and gives rise to polarization effects.

Scattering by particles with a size comparable to or larger than the wavelength of the light is typically treated by the Mie theory, the discrete dipole approximation and other computational techniques. Rayleigh scattering applies to particles that are small with respect to wavelengths of light, and that are optically "soft" (i.e., with a refractive index close to 1). Anomalous diffraction theory applies to optically soft but larger particles.

History
In 1869, while attempting to determine whether any contaminants remained in the purified air he used for infrared experiments, John Tyndall discovered that bright light scattering off nanoscopic particulates was faintly blue-tinted. He conjectured that a similar scattering of sunlight gave the sky its blue hue, but he could not explain the preference for blue light, nor could atmospheric dust explain the intensity of the sky's color.

In 1871, Lord Rayleigh published two papers on the color and polarization of skylight to quantify Tyndall's effect in water droplets in terms of the tiny particulates' volumes and refractive indices. In 1881, with the benefit of James Clerk Maxwell's 1865 proof of the electromagnetic nature of light, he showed that his equations followed from electromagnetism. In 1899, he showed that they applied to individual molecules, with terms containing particulate volumes and refractive indices replaced with terms for molecular polarizability.

Small size parameter approximation
The size of a scattering particle is often parameterized by the ratio

where r is the particle's radius, λ is the wavelength of the light and x is a dimensionless parameter that characterizes the particle's interaction with the incident radiation such that: Objects with x ≫ 1 act as geometric shapes, scattering light according to their projected area. At the intermediate x ≃ 1 of Mie scattering, interference effects develop through phase variations over the object's surface. Rayleigh scattering applies to the case when the scattering particle is very small (x ≪ 1, with a particle size < 1/10 of wavelength) and the whole surface re-radiates with the same phase. Because the particles are randomly positioned, the scattered light arrives at a particular point with a random collection of phases; it is incoherent and the resulting intensity is just the sum of the squares of the amplitudes from each particle and therefore proportional to the inverse fourth power of the wavelength and the sixth power of its size. The wavelength dependence is characteristic of dipole scattering and the volume dependence will apply to any scattering mechanism. In detail, the intensity of light scattered by any one of the small spheres of diameter d and refractive index n from a beam of unpolarized light of wavelength λ and intensity I0 is given by

where R is the distance to the particle and θ is the scattering angle. Averaging this over all angles gives the Rayleigh scattering cross-section

The fraction of light scattered by scattering particles over the unit travel length (e.g., meter) is the number of particles per unit volume N times the cross-section. This means that at atmospheric pressure, where there are about  molecules per cubic meter, about a fraction 10−5 of the light will be scattered for every meter of travel.

The strong wavelength dependence of the scattering (~λ−4) means that shorter (blue) wavelengths are scattered more strongly than longer (red) wavelengths.

From molecules

The expression above can also be written in terms of individual molecules by expressing the dependence on refractive index in terms of the molecular polarizability α, proportional to the dipole moment induced by the electric field of the light. In this case, the Rayleigh scattering intensity for a single particle is given in CGS-units by

Effect of fluctuations 
When the dielectric constant  of a certain region of volume  is different from the average dielectric constant of the medium , then any incident light will be scattered according to the following equation

where  represents the variance of the fluctuation in the dielectric constant .

Cause of the blue color of the sky

The strong wavelength dependence of the scattering (~λ−4) means that shorter (blue) wavelengths are scattered more strongly than longer (red) wavelengths. This results in the indirect blue light coming from all regions of the sky.  Rayleigh scattering is a good approximation of the manner in which light scattering occurs within various media for which scattering particles have a small size (parameter).

A portion of the beam of light coming from the sun scatters off molecules of gas and other small particles in the atmosphere. Here, Rayleigh scattering primarily occurs through sunlight's interaction with randomly located air molecules. It is this scattered light that gives the surrounding sky its brightness and its color. As previously stated, Rayleigh scattering is inversely proportional to the fourth power of wavelength, so that shorter wavelength violet and blue light will scatter more than the longer wavelengths (yellow and especially red light). However, the Sun, like any star, has its own spectrum and so I0 in the scattering formula above is not constant but falls away in the violet. In addition the oxygen in the Earth's atmosphere absorbs wavelengths at the edge of the ultra-violet region of the spectrum.  The resulting color, which appears like a pale blue, actually is a mixture of all the scattered colors, mainly blue and green.  Conversely, glancing toward the sun, the colors that were not scattered away—the longer wavelengths such as red and yellow light—are directly visible, giving the sun itself a slightly yellowish hue. Viewed from space, however, the sky is black and the sun is white.

The reddening of the sun is intensified when it is near the horizon because the light being received directly from it must pass through more of the atmosphere. The effect is further increased because the sunlight must pass through a greater proportion of the atmosphere nearer the earth's surface, where it is denser. This removes a significant proportion of the shorter wavelength (blue) and medium wavelength (green) light from the direct path to the observer. The remaining unscattered light is therefore mostly of longer wavelengths and appears more red.

Some of the scattering can also be from sulfate particles. For years after large Plinian eruptions, the blue cast of the sky is notably brightened by the persistent sulfate load of the stratospheric gases. Some works of the artist J. M. W. Turner may owe their vivid red colours to the eruption of Mount Tambora in his lifetime.

In locations with little light pollution, the moonlit night sky is also blue, because moonlight is reflected sunlight, with a slightly lower color temperature due to the brownish color of the moon. The moonlit sky is not perceived as blue, however, because at low light levels human vision comes mainly from rod cells that do not produce any color perception (Purkinje effect).

Of sound in amorphous solids
Rayleigh scattering is also an important mechanism of wave scattering in amorphous solids such as glass, and is responsible for acoustic wave damping and phonon damping in glasses and granular matter at low or not too high temperatures. This is because in glasses at higher temperatures the Rayleigh-type scattering regime is obscured by the anharmonic damping (typically with a ~λ−2 dependence on wavelength), which becomes increasingly more important as the temperature rises.

Rayleigh scattering in gases, strictly speaking, is induced by microscopic dipole fluctuations in the electromagnetic field of visible light. In amorphous solids, theories have been proposed which argue that Rayleigh-type scattering arises due to wave scattering from macroscopic spatial fluctuations in the elastic shear modulus.
More recently, however, a Rayleigh-type quartic dependence of the damping coefficient on the sound wavelength, ~λ−4, has been derived from first principles based on wave scattering from microscopic motions of the atoms or particles (i.e. the microscopic building blocks of the solid), known as "nonaffine" motions, which are of crucial importance for the elasticity of amorphous solids. The effect has been derived by Baggioli & Zaccone and numerically confirmed, independently, by Szamel & Flenner. The numerical analysis has also revealed that the  ~λ−4 contribution from macroscopic fluctuations of shear modulus is quantitatively negligible compared to the  ~λ−4 scattering contribution from nonaffine motions. Furthermore, the microscopic theory is able to recover the crossover from diffusive type ~λ−2 scattering which dominates at lower wavevectors to the Rayleigh-type ~λ−4 scattering at higher wavevectors.

In amorphous solids - glasses - optical fibers
Rayleigh scattering is an important component of the scattering of optical signals in optical fibers. Silica fibers are glasses,  disordered materials with microscopic variations of density and refractive index. These give rise to energy losses due to the scattered light, with the following coefficient:

where n is the refraction index, p is the photoelastic coefficient of the glass, k is the Boltzmann constant, and β is the isothermal compressibility. Tf is a fictive temperature, representing the temperature at which the density fluctuations are "frozen" in the material.

In porous materials

Rayleigh-type λ−4 scattering can also be exhibited by porous materials. An example is the strong optical scattering by nanoporous materials. The strong contrast in refractive index between pores and solid parts of sintered alumina results in very strong scattering, with light completely changing direction each five micrometers on average. The λ−4-type scattering is caused by the nanoporous structure (a narrow pore size distribution around ~70 nm) obtained by sintering monodispersive alumina powder.

See also
 
 
 
 
 
 
 
 
 HRS Computing – scientific simulation software

Works

References

Further reading

C.F. Bohren, D. Huffman, Absorption and scattering of light by small particles, John Wiley, New York 1983. Contains a good description of the asymptotic behavior of Mie theory for small size parameter (Rayleigh approximation).
 
 
 
  Gives a brief history of theories of why the sky is blue leading up to Rayleigh's discovery, and a brief description of Rayleigh scattering.

External links
 HyperPhysics description of Rayleigh scattering
 Full physical explanation of sky color, in simple terms

Scattering, absorption and radiative transfer (optics)
Atmospheric optical phenomena
Visibility
Light
Phenomena
Scientific phenomena
Physical phenomena